Laisom Ibomcha Singh is an Indian politician and member of the Nationalist Congress Party. Ibomcha Singh is a member of the Manipur Legislative Assembly from the Keishamthong constituency in Imphal West district.

References 

People from Imphal West district
Living people
Manipur Peoples Party politicians
21st-century Indian politicians
Indian National Congress politicians
Nationalist Congress Party politicians from Manipur
Year of birth missing (living people)
Manipur MLAs 2002–2007
Manipur MLAs 2012–2017